was a Japanese politician. He served three terms as Mayor of Toyama City in Japan from 1959 to 1971.

References 

「289. 歴代市長」『第37回富山市統計書（平成16年度版）』("289. Former mayor," " (FY2004 edition, 2011) 37th Toyama statistical documentation ")
「304. 歴代市長」『第3回富山市統計書（平成19年度版）』("304. Former mayor," " (FY2007 edition, 2011) 3rd Toyama statistical documentation ")
『富山県議会百年のあゆみ』（富山県議会編纂、富山県議会事務局発行、1984年） ("History of hundred years Toyama prefectural assembly" (Toyama prefectural assembly compilation, Toyama prefectural assembly secretariat issue, 1984))
『富山県名士録』（富山県名士録編纂協会、1965年）("Toyama celebrity book" (Toyama notable book compilation Association, 1965))
『人物山脈』（松本直治著　富山県文化連盟発行、1951年）("Person Mountains" (Toyama culture Federation issued Matsumoto Naoji Author, 1951)")
『地方自治関係秋の叙勲名簿』（自治省、1965年） ("Conferment roster of local self-government relationship fall" (Ministry of Home Affairs, 1965)

『富山市史　第五巻』（富山市役所編集発行、1980年）(The fifth edition Toyama History" (Toyama City Hall Publishing Editor, 1980) )
 

1894 births
1978 deaths
Japanese politicians